Robert Antoni (born 1958) is a West Indian writer who was awarded the 1999 Aga Khan Prize for Fiction by The Paris Review for My Grandmother's Tale of How Crab-o Lost His Head.  He is a Guggenheim Fellow for 2010 for his work on the historical novel As Flies to Whatless Boys.

Early life
Robert Antoni was born in the United States of Trinidadian parents and grew up largely in the Bahamas, where his father practised medicine.  He says his "fictional world" is "Corpus Christi", the invented island (based on Trinidad) that he introduced in his first novel, Divina Trace (1991).

Antoni studied at Duke University and in the creative writing programme at Johns Hopkins University, before joining the Iowa Writers' Workshop at the University of Iowa, where he began working on Divina Trace. 
He has said that he spent a total of ten years completing the novel, which won the Commonwealth Writers' Prize for best first novel in 1992.

Career
Antoni lived for a time in Barcelona and taught at the University of Miami from 1992 to 2001. In 2004, he began teaching at Barnard College, Columbia University and The New School. In 2010, he was a Guggenheim Fellow.

His novel As Flies to Whatless Boys was the overall winner of the 2014 OCM Bocas Prize for Caribbean Literature. At the award ceremony on 26 April, Antoni pledged to share the US$10,000 prize money with the other finalists, Lorna Goodison (winner of the poetry category for Oracabessa) and Kei Miller (winner of the literary non-fiction category for Writing Down the Vision: Essays and Prophecies). Kei Miller and Antoni were both features presenters at the 2018 Key West Literary Seminar: Writers of the Caribbean.

Antoni currently resides in New York City where he teaches Literature at The New School for Public Engagement.

Awards and honours
1992 Commonwealth Writers' Prize: Best First Book, Divina Trace
1999 Aga Khan Prize for Fiction, My Grandmother's Tale of How Crab-o Lost His Head
2010 Guggenheim Fellow for his work on the historical novel As Flies to Whatless Boys
2014 OCM Bocas Prize for Caribbean Literature (Fiction and overall winner), As Flies to Whatless Boys

Bibliography

Novels
Divina Trace, Robin Clark, 1991, 
Blessed Is the Fruit, Henry Holt and Co., 1997, 
My Grandmother's Erotic Folktales, 2000; Grove Press, 2002, 
Carnival, Black Cat, 2005,

Nonfiction
1998 "Another Day Under the Black Volcano" in Outside Magazine
1999 "Blackbeard Doesn't Come Here Anymore" in Outside Magazine
2001 "Party in the Islands" in Ocean Drive Magazine

Anthologies
Robert Antoni, Bradford Morrow (eds), The Archipelago: New writing from and about the Caribbean, Bard College, 1996,

See also 

 Caribbean literature
 Caribbean poetry
 Postcolonial literature

Notes

References
Gifford, Sheryl. “(Re)Making Men, Representing the Caribbean Nation: Individuation in the Works of Fred D’Aguiar, Robert Antoni, and Marlon James.” Diss. Florida Atlantic U, 2013.
.
Patteson, Richard Francis.  The Fiction of Robert Antoni: Writing in the Estuary, University of the West Indies Press, 2010,

External links
Official website
 "Robert Antoni by Lawrence Scott" (interview), BOMB 91, Spring 2005.

1958 births
Living people
Trinidad and Tobago novelists
Duke University alumni
Iowa Writers' Workshop alumni
The New School faculty
Barnard College faculty
Trinidad and Tobago male writers
20th-century male writers
21st-century male writers